Er. Rachpal Singh Gill (3 April 1908 – 10 August 2001) was a Sikh Indian civil engineer responsible for key engineering projects such as the Bhakra Nangal hydro power complex, Ranjit Sagar Dam, Pong Dam, and the thermal power plants at Bathinda as well as Roopnagar.

Early life and education
Rachpal Singh graduated in civil engineering from King's College, University of London.

Career
He started his career when he joined the Irrigation Branch in 1943. After partition, he was selected to work as Officer on Special Duty dealing with the sensitive problems of water disputes.

He also served as the Chairman for the Punjab State Electricity Board (PSEB) in the 1960s, Chairman of the Board of Consultants and Construction, Planning and Equipment Committee of Ranjit Sagar Dam.  and was widely regarded as an excellent technocrat.

Family
The second son of the first Sikh railway engineer Sardar Nagiah Singh Gill, he was born in Ludhiana and studied his civil engineering at Kings college University of London. His children include the famous DGP of Punjab K.P.S. Gill.

Works
 Manufacture and Control of Concrete for the Bakhra Dam, by R. S. Gill and Harish Chander Indian Concrete Journal (ICJ), Vol.34 No. p .444

References

1908 births
2001 deaths
Engineers from Punjab, India
Indian civil engineers
Alumni of King's College London
Indian Sikhs
20th-century Indian engineers